EveryWAN Mobility Manager is a Mobile Device Management platform that acts as a centralized control center to enable management of large numbers of mobile handheld devices.

Sparus Software is the company developing the EveryWAN Mobility Manager software, and has offices in Paris, France and Wantage, United Kingdom.

EveryWAN Mobility Manager has won awards like the Syntec Innovation Grand Prize 2008  and the 2007 Innovation Trophy  from La Tribune.

Sources 

 Smartphone & Pocket PC Magazine - Encyclopedia for EveryWAN Mobility Manager
 EveryWAN Mobility Manager - Mobile Device Management
 Le Monde Informatique - Sparus and Kxen win the Internet Entrepreneur Club's prize
 L'Usine Nouvelle - Sparus, Ubiquick and Quescom software companies
 ZDNet - EveryWAN Mobility Manager video
 La Tribune - Sparus, EDS,Evodia,Atos and Praxedo recognized as innovative companies

Notes and references 

Mobile software